Thomas D. Schiano (born August 12, 1962), M.D., is an American specialist in liver transplantation, intestinal transplantation and in the diagnosis and treatment of acute and chronic liver disease. He serves as associate editor for the journals Hepatology and Liver Transplantation and has published more than 200 peer-reviewed articles and abstracts and more than 20 book chapters.

Schiano is currently professor of medicine at the Mount Sinai School of Medicine as well as the medical director of adult liver transplantation, medical director of intestinal transplantation and director of clinical hepatology at the Recanati/Miller Transplantation Institute at the Mount Sinai Medical Center in New York City. He is listed among New York Magazine's Best Doctors, as well as among the New York Times Magazine's list of Super Doctors 2008 -2011.

Biography
Schiano was born in Brooklyn, New York. He graduated from Fordham University with a B.S. in biology and a minor in philosophy in 1979 and received his M.D. from Universidad Del Noreste Medical School in Tampico, Mexico in 1983. His residency and chief residency in internal medicine were completed at Maimonides Medical Center and he completed fellowships at Memorial Sloan-Kettering (in clinical nutrition), Temple University Hospital (in gastroenterology), and Mount Sinai Hospital (in liver disease and liver transplantation).

Schiano is a member of the American Association for the Study of Liver Diseases, the American College of Gastroenterology, the American Gastroenterological Association, the American Society for Gastrointestinal Endoscopy, the New York Organ Donor Network and the American Society of Transplantation.

Areas of research include liver transplantation, living donor liver transplantation, herbal and drug hepatotoxicity, nutrition and liver disease, cirrhosis, intestinal transplantation, recurrence of disease post-liver transplantation, treatment of viral hepatitis post-liver transplantation, herbal and alternative treatments of chronic liver disease, complications of cirrhosis, portal hypertension, and cholestasis associated with TPN.

Schiano is the currently a principal investigator on clinical trial A Rollover Protocol to Provide Open-Label Emtricitabine/Tenofovir Disoproxil Fumarate Combination Product to Subjects Completing the GS-US-203-0107 Study, Protocol GS-US-203-0109.

Honors and awards
Partial list: 
2009, 2011, Best Doctors in America 
2009, 2010, New York Magazine Top Doctors
2008-2011, New York Super Doctors, the New York Times Magazine
2008, 2009, 2011, Castle Connolly America's Top Doctors
2006, TRIO (Transplant Recipients International Organization) Manhattan Chapter Triangle Award for Transplant Physicians
1995, Sol Sherry Award for Excellence in Basic Research, Temple University Hospital

Book chapters

Partial list:

Liu J-B, Schiano TD, Miller LS. Upper gastrointestinal tract.  In Liu J-B, Goldberg BB (eds): Endoluminal Ultrasound.  London, Martin Dunitz Ltd, 1998;147-200.
Alexander AA, Miller LS, Schiano TD, Liu-J-B. Lower gastrointestinal tract.  In Liu J-B, Goldberg BB (eds): Endoluminal Ultrasound.  London, Martin Dunitz Ltd, 1998;201-28.
Miller LS, Schiano TD, Liu J-B.  Pancreaticobiliary tract:  In Liu J-B, Goldberg BB (eds): Endoluminal Ultrasound.  London, Martin Dunitz Ltd, 1998;229-50.
Schiano TD, Ehrenpreis ED.  Gut and hepatobiliary dysfunction: In Hall JB, Schmidt GA, Wood LDH (eds): Principles of Critical Care, 2nd edition, U.S.A., McGraw-Hill, 1998;1221-36.
Schiano TD, Black M.  Drug-induced and toxic liver disease. In Friedman LS, Keeffe EB (eds): Handbook of Liver Disease.  London, Churchill Livingstone, 1998;103-24. 
Black M, Schiano TD. Management of overlap syndromes. In Krawitt EL (ed): Medical Management of Liver Diseases. New York, Marcel Dekker, Inc. 1999;165-80.
Schiano TD. Tumors and cysts: In DiBiase JK (ed): Gastroenterology and Hepatology. Pearls of Wisdom. Boston, MA, Boston Medical Publishing Corporation, 2000;255-260.
Schiano TD, Bodenheimer HC. Complications of chronic liver disease. In Friedman SL, McQuaid KR, Grendell JH (eds): Current Diagnosis and Treatment in Gastroenterology. 2nd edition, USA, McGraw-Hill 2003;639-663.
Friedman SL, Schiano TD. Cirrhosis and Its Sequelae.  In: Goldman L, Ausiello D (eds): Cecil Textbook of Medicine, 22nd edition, Philadelphia, Saunders 2004;936-44.
Ehrenpreis ED, Schiano TD. Gut and hepatobiliary dysfunction: In Hall JB, Schmidt GA. Wood LDH (eds):  Principles of critical care, 3rd edition, USA, McGraw-Hill, 2005;81:1247-1260.
Schiano TD, Hunt K.  Occupational and environmental hepatotoxicity: In Zakim D, Boyer TD:  Hepatology.  A textbook of liver disease, 5th edition.  Saunders/Elsevier, Philadelphia, PA 2006;561-77.
Liu LU, Schiano TD. Hepatotoxicity of herbal medicines, vitamins, and natural hepatotoxins.  Drug-Induced Liver Disease, 2nd ed.  Kaplowitz N and DeLeve LD (editors).  Informa Healthcare USA, Inc. 2007;733-754.

Publications
Partial list:

References

External links
The Mount Sinai Medical Center homepage
The Mount Sinai School of Medicine homepage
The Recanati/Miller Transplantation Institute at Mount Sinai Medical Center

1962 births
Fordham University alumni
Living people
Icahn School of Medicine at Mount Sinai faculty
People from Brooklyn
American transplant surgeons
Fellows of the American Gastroenterological Association